Starmatic was a social networking-enabled photo sharing and filtering application for the Apple iPhone, launched in September 2012.

History
Starmatic made its debut on the Apple App Store on September 5, 2012, gained almost 500,000 users, and was discontinued in May 2014.

Backstory
The Starmatic application was named after the Starmatic Brownie camera introduced by Eastman Kodak in 1959.  Starmatic was part of Kodak's Brownies Star series launched in 1957. Made of plastic and relatively cheap, Starmatic fell in the category of toy cameras and was sold over an estimated 10 million units in 5 years.

The icon and the camera of the application were modeled after the original Starmatic camera while the two rolls of filters, Starmacolor and Starmachrome, have been inspired by the 127 films used by Starmatic cameras.

Reception
Starmatic made Apple's Top 25 New and Noteworthy iPhone apps in 20 countries (including USA, China, Japan, Italy and France) and gained over 50,000 registered users from around the world within a month.

Starmatic was named an App of the Week by Stuff magazine, The Guardian, AppAdvice and AppMyWorld. The app was praised for its nice interface and was wholly perceived by the media as a qualitative and serious alternative to Instagram.

Nicholas Carron, in its extensive review of the app for We Are Juxt stated: Upon opening the app for the first time, there is an immediate sense that the Starmatic team not only understood the niche benefits of reviving a legendary brand, they utilized their various backgrounds in design, fashion, photography, advertising and previous business pursuits to create a handheld, interactive product that is visually appealing and tempts exploration.

Upon its launch, Starmatic has also been recommended via Twitter by the Apple App Store and by British actor Stephen Fry to its 5 million followers.

References

External links
Grampros.com

2012 software
IOS software
Image-sharing websites
Defunct social networking services
Kodak cameras